The 2017 FIVB Volleyball Men's U21 World Championship was the nineteenth edition of the FIVB Volleyball Men's U21 World Championship, contested by the men's national teams under the age of 21 of the members of the FIVB, the sport's global governing body. The tournament was held in Brno and Ceské Budejovice, Czech Republic from 23 June to 2 July 2017. 16 teams participated.

Players must be born on or after 1 January 1997.

Poland defeated Cuba in the final to capture their third title in the competition. Russia, which won the previously three editions of the tournament, won the bronze medal after defeating Brazil in the 3rd place match. Jakub Kochanowski from Poland was elected the MVP.

Qualification
The FIVB Sports Events Council revealed a proposal to streamline the number of teams participating in the Age Group World Championships.

Pools composition

First round
Teams were seeded in the first two positions of each pool following the serpentine system according to their FIVB U21 World Ranking as of January 2017. FIVB reserved the right to seed the hosts as head of pool A regardless of the U21 World Ranking. All teams not seeded were drawn to take other available positions in the remaining lines, following the U21 World Ranking. The draw was held in Brno, Czech Republic on 31 May 2017. Rankings are shown in brackets except the hosts who ranked 35th.

Draw

Second round

Squads

Venues

Pool standing procedure
 Number of matches won
 Match points
 Sets ratio
 Points ratio
 If the tie continues as per the point ratio between two teams, the priority will be given to the team which won the last match between them. When the tie in points ratio is between three or more teams, a new classification of these teams in the terms of points 1, 2 and 3 will be made taking into consideration only the matches in which they were opposed to each other.

Match won 3–0 or 3–1: 3 match points for the winner, 0 match points for the loser
Match won 3–2: 2 match points for the winner, 1 match point for the loser

First round
All times are Central European Summer Time (UTC+02:00).

Pool A

|}

|}

Pool B

|}

|}

Pool C

|}

|}

Pool D

|}

|}

Second round
All times are Central European Summer Time (UTC+02:00).

Pool E

|}

|}

Pool F

|}

|}

Pool G

|}

|}

Pool H

|}

|}

Final round
All times are Central European Summer Time (UTC+02:00).

13th–16th places

13th–16th semifinals

|}

15th place match

|}

13th place match

|}

9th–12th places

9th–12th semifinals

|}

11th place match

|}

9th place match

|}

5th–8th places

5th–8th semifinals

|}

7th place match

|}

5th place match

|}

Final four

Semifinals

|}

3rd place match

|}

Final

|}

Final standing

Awards

Most Valuable Player
 Jakub Kochanowski
Best Setter
 Łukasz Kozub
Best Outside Spikers
 Bartosz Kwolek
 Anton Semyshev

Best Middle Blockers
 Aleksei Kononov
 José Masso
Best Opposite Spiker
 Miguel Gutiérrez
Best Libero
 Maique Nascimento

See also
2017 FIVB Volleyball Women's U20 World Championship

References

External links
Official website
Final Standing
Awards
Statistics

FIVB Volleyball Men's U21 World Championship
FIVB Volleyball Men's U21 World Championship
International volleyball competitions hosted by the Czech Republic
2017 in Czech sport
Sport in Brno
Sport in České Budějovice
June 2017 sports events in Europe
July 2017 sports events in Europe